Play Strindberg is a comedy play by the Swiss writer Friedrich Dürrenmatt, written in 1968 and published in 1969. It is a free adaptation of August Strindberg's The Dance of Death (1900), using Strindberg's characters. The title is a reference to Jacques Loussier's Play Bach series of recordings. The play premiered in Basel on 8 February 1969.

See also
 Swiss literature
 1969 in literature

References

1969 plays
Adaptations of works by August Strindberg
German-language plays
Plays by Friedrich Dürrenmatt